The Australian Open is an annual squash tournament conducted by Australia, held since 1980. The event is on the Professional Squash Association (PSA) international circuit. The Australian Open replaced the Australian Amateur Championship, which was conducted from 1928 until 1979.

Men's

Women's

References

External links
Australian Open Official website

Sport in Melbourne
Recurring sporting events established in 1980
Squash tournaments in Australia
1980 establishments in Australia